Public School No. 60, also known as Riverside Academy, is a historic school building located in the Riverside neighborhood of Buffalo, Erie County, New York. The original section was built in 1897, and is a three-story, 12 bay, "I"-plan red brick building with Renaissance Revival detailing. It sits on a raised basement and features polychrome, stepped façade, quoining, and classical entrances.  A substantial three-story rear addition was built in 1922 and includes an auditorium. The building has been converted to accommodate 68 units of affordable housing.

It was listed on the National Register of Historic Places in 2014.

References

External links
Riverside Apartments

School buildings on the National Register of Historic Places in New York (state)
Renaissance Revival architecture in New York (state)
School buildings completed in 1897
Buildings and structures in Buffalo, New York
National Register of Historic Places in Buffalo, New York